Paul Delos Boyer (July 31, 1918 – June 2, 2018) was an American biochemist, analytical chemist, and a professor of chemistry at University of California Los Angeles (UCLA). He shared the 1997 Nobel Prize in Chemistry for research on the "enzymatic mechanism underlying the biosynthesis of adenosine triphosphate (ATP)" (ATP synthase) with John E. Walker, making Boyer the first Utah-born Nobel laureate; the remainder of the Prize in that year was awarded to Danish chemist Jens Christian Skou for his discovery of the Na+/K+-ATPase.

Birth and education
Boyer was born in Provo, Utah. He grew up in a nonpracticing Mormon family. He attended Provo High School, where he was active in student government and the debating team. He received a B.S. in chemistry from Brigham Young University in 1939 and obtained a Wisconsin Alumni Research Foundation Scholarship for graduate studies. Five days before leaving for Wisconsin, Paul married Lyda Whicker in 1939, and they remained married for nearly eighty years until his death in 2018, making him the longest-married Nobel laureate. The Boyers had three children.

Though the Boyers connected with the Mormon community in Wisconsin, they considered themselves "on the wayward fringe" and doubted the doctrinal claims of the Church of Jesus Christ of Latter-day Saints (LDS Church).  After experimenting with Unitarianism, Boyer eventually became an atheist. In 2003 he was one of 22 Nobel laureates who signed the Humanist Manifesto.

Academic career
After Boyer received his Ph.D. degree in biochemistry from the University of Wisconsin–Madison in 1943, he spent years at Stanford University on a war-related research project dedicated to stabilization of serum albumin for transfusions. He began his independent research career at the University of Minnesota and introduced kinetic, isotopic, and chemical methods for investigating enzyme mechanisms. In 1955, he received a Guggenheim Fellowship and worked with Professor Hugo Theorell on the mechanism of alcohol dehydrogenase. In 1956, he accepted a Hill Foundation Professorship and moved to the medical campus of the University of Minnesota. In 1959–1960, he served as Chairman of the Biochemistry Section of the American Chemical Society (ACS) and in 1969-1970 as President of the American Society of Biological Chemists.

Since 1963, he had been a professor in the Department of Chemistry and Biochemistry at University of California, Los Angeles. In 1965, he became the Founding Director of the Molecular Biology Institute and spearheaded the construction of the building and the organization of an interdepartmental Ph.D. program. This institutional service did not diminish the creativity and originality of his research program, which led to three postulates for the binding mechanism for ATP synthesis—that energy input was not used primarily to form ATP but to promote the binding of phosphate and mostly the release of tightly bound ATP; that three identical catalytic sites went through compulsory, sequential binding changes; and that the binding changes of the catalytic subunits, circularly arranged on the periphery of the enzyme, were driven by the rotation of a smaller internal subunit.

Paul Boyer was Editor or Associate Editor of the Annual Review of Biochemistry from 1963 to 1989. He was Editor of the classic series, "The Enzymes". In 1981, he was Faculty Research Lecturer at UCLA. In that same year, he was awarded the prestigious Tolman Medal by the Southern California Section of the American Chemical Society.

Death
Boyer died of respiratory failure on June 2, 2018, at the age of 99, less than two months shy of his 100th birthday at his Los Angeles home.

Publications
Dahms, A. S. & P. D. Boyer. "Occurrence and Characteristics of 18O-exchange Reactions Catalyzed By Sodium- and Potassium-dependent Adenosine Triphosphatases", University of California Los Angeles (UCLA), United States Department of Energy (through predecessor agency the Atomic Energy Commission), (1972).
Kanazawa, T. & P. D. Boyer. "Occurrence and Characteristics of a Rapid Exchange of Phosphate Oxygens Catalyzed by Sarcoplasmic Reticulum Vesicles", University of California Los Angeles (UCLA), United States Department of Energy (through predecessor agency the Atomic Energy Commission), (1972).
Boyer, P. D. "Isotopic Studies on Structure-function Relationships of Nucleic Acids and Enzymes. Three Year Progress Report, May 1972 — October 1975", University of California Los Angeles (UCLA), United States Department of Energy (through predecessor agency the Energy Research and Development Administration), (1975).
Boyer, P. D. "Energy Capture and Use in Plants and Bacteria. Final Technical Report", University of California Los Angeles (UCLA), United States Department of Energy, (December 31, 1993).

Awards and honors

References

Notes

External links 
  including the Nobel Lecture, December 8, 1997 Energy, Life, and ATP
 Nobel Prize press release — The 1997 Nobel Prize in Chemistry
 UCLA webpage — Paul D. Boyer

1918 births
2018 deaths
American atheists
American biochemists
American Nobel laureates
Brigham Young University alumni
Former Latter Day Saints
Members of the United States National Academy of Sciences
Nobel laureates in Chemistry
People from Provo, Utah
Provo High School alumni
University of Minnesota faculty
University of California, Los Angeles faculty
University of Wisconsin–Madison alumni
Annual Reviews (publisher) editors
Members of the American Philosophical Society